Daniela Serpilli (born 2 February 1944) is an Italian former swimmer. She competed in two events at the 1960 Summer Olympics.

References

1944 births
Living people
Italian female swimmers
Olympic swimmers of Italy
Swimmers at the 1960 Summer Olympics
Swimmers from Rome